Latrell Schaumkel (born 27 July 1994) is a professional rugby league footballer who plays as a er for Toulouse Olympique in the Super League. He previously played for Villeneuve in Elite 1. He played lower grades in Australia before moving to France and is an international with Niue.

Background
Schaumkel played junior rugby league with Richmond Rovers before progressing through the ranks at Manly, North Sydney Bears and Newtown Jets before furthering his career in France.

Club career

Manly-Warringah Sea Eagles
In 2010 Schaumkel was a member of the Manly Warringah Sea Eagles Harold Matthews Cup side. He graduated in 2011 to the S. G. Ball Cup. In 2012, he progressed to the Holden Cup making five appearances and scoring one try. In 2013, he scored a further 6 tries in 18 more appearances and also played 3 times in the NSW Cup.

North Sydney Bears
Schaumkel played for North Sydney in the NSW Cup between 2015 and 2017.

Newtown
Between 2019 and 2020, Schaumkel played for Newtown in the NSW Cup.

Villeneuve
Schaumkel made 11 appearances for the Leopards in the 2020/21 Elite 1 season, scoring 14 tries.

Toulouse Olympique
On 5 August 2020, Toulouse announced that Schaumkel had signed for the 2021 Betfred Championship season. Schaumkel played in 11 of Toulouse's 15 games, scoring 11 tries, including one in the Million Pound Game victory over Featherstone Rovers that saw TO promoted to Super League for 2022.

International career
Schaumkel made a try-scoring debut for Niue in the 26-16 2018 Emerging Nations World Championship win on 4 October 2018 against Malta. His second cap came three days later, when he scored in the 24-12 win against the Philippines. His third appearance was in the semi-final win over Greece and he was again selected for the final on 13 October which Niue lost 24-16 to Malta.

References

External links
 Toulouse Olympique XIII profile

1994 births
Living people
New Zealand rugby league players
Niue national rugby league team players
Toulouse Olympique players
Villeneuve Leopards players
Rugby league centres
Rugby league wingers
Rugby league fullbacks